Sovereign Mountain is a summit in the Talkeetna Mountains in the Matanuska-Susitna Borough of Alaska, United States. The prominent is  ranking it 70th on the List of the most prominent summits of the United States.

With an elevation of  it is the highest peak in the Talkeetna Mountains.

See also

List of mountain peaks of Alaska
List of the most prominent summits of Alaska

References

Mountains of Alaska